This is a listing of notable alumni and honorary members of Alpha Phi Omega, an international service fraternity. The list includes members of the fraternity who have become well known or who have attained high ranking positions in their particular career field, such as government and politics, academia, science and technology, sports, or business. Notable alumni refers to both individuals who joined individual Alpha Phi Omega chapters as students who later went on to distinguish themselves in their personal or professional lives and advisors who are members of the faculty, staff, Scouting or community selected by a chapter to advise them. An honorary member refers to individuals who were offered honorary membership in either various Alpha Phi Omega chapters or Nationally as non-students.

The majority of chapters are in the United States of America, and nearly all of the remainder are in The Philippines.
  Denotes Honorary Member status.
  Denotes member of Alpha Phi Omega - Republic of the Philippines.

Academia

Business

Entertainment and sports

Government and politics

Science, medicine and technology

Scouting

Service, non-profit and religion

See also
 List of Eagle Scouts (Boy Scouts of America)
 List of notable Scouts

References

External links
 List of Notable Alpha Phi Omega Philippines brothers and sisters maintained by Alpha Phi Omega Philippines.
 Online source for Torch and Trefoil magazines

Members
Alpha Phi Omega
Alpha Phi Omega